The 7th Politburo of the Communist Party of Cuba (PCC) was elected in 2016 by the 1st Plenary Session of the 7th Central Committee in the immediate aftermath of the 7th Party Congress.

Members

References

Specific

Bibliography
Articles and journals:
 

7th Politburo of the Communist Party of Cuba
2016 establishments in Cuba
2021 disestablishments in Cuba